Dieguito is a given name or nickname, meaning "Little Diego". Notable people with the name include:
Dieguito (footballer, born 1983), Spanish footballer
Dieguito (footballer, born 1989), Spanish footballer